The Neuchâtel International Fantastic Film Festival (NIFFF) is a Swiss film festival dedicated to fantastic movies. It was created in 2000 and is now renowned internationally as one of the foremost film festivals in the world for genre cinema. The NIFFF defines itself through a rich and diversified programming, constructed around three central axes: Fantastic cinema, Asian cinema and Digital images. The films shown at the Festival are very diversified, ranging from major works by renowned directors to unknown and underground films d'auteurs. Famous fantastic film directors have already honored the NIFFF with their presences, including George A. Romero, Joe Dante, John Landis, Terry Gilliam, Hideo Nakata.

The NIFFF offers five competitions: an international competition, an Asian competition, a Best Swiss Short Film Competition, a Best European Short Film Competition and a Swiss Video Art Competition entitled Actual Fears and inaugurated in 2008.

Since its creation, the NIFFF has been programmed each year during the first week of July, except in 2001. In 2008, the NIFFF celebrates its eighth edition and counts amongst the major cinematographic events in Switzerland, supported by the Swiss Federal Office of Culture.

List of award winners

See also
 Fantafestival

Notes and references

External links 
 
 Collection of press cuttings for 2008 Edition of Festival (Warning; 30Mb)
 Streetwear information on NIFFF
 Melies information on NIFFF

Film festivals in Switzerland
Fantasy and horror film festivals
Recurring events established in 2000
Neuchâtel
Tourist attractions in the canton of Neuchâtel
Summer events in Switzerland